Lukáš Pleško (born 21 May 1977) is a professional Czech football player.

References
 
 

Czech footballers
Czech Republic youth international footballers
Czech Republic under-21 international footballers
Czech First League players
1977 births
Living people
FK Chmel Blšany players
FC Viktoria Plzeň players
Sportspeople from Plzeň
1. FK Příbram players
Association football defenders